The 1981–82 season of the Bayernliga, the third tier of the German football league system in the state of Bavaria at the time, was the 37th season of the league.

Overview
The league champions, FC Augsburg, were promoted to the 2. Bundesliga after successfully competing in the promotion round. For Augsburg it was their third Bayernliga title after 1972–73 and 1979–80.

Runners-up FC Schweinfurt 05 qualified for the German amateur championship, where the club lost to Hertha Zehlendorf in the first round.

The bottom five clubs were directly relegated from the league while 15th placed SC Fürstenfeldbruck had to enter the relegation round with the Landesliga runners-up where it lost to SpVgg Landshut in the first round. Fürstenfeldbruck returned to the Bayernliga in 1985 while, of the other relegated clubs, ATS Kulmbach never played in the Bayernliga again. FC Amberg won promotion back to the Bayernliga in 1986, ESV Ingolstadt in 1984, TSV 1860 Rosenheim in 1995 and ASV Neumarkt in 2000.

Franz Schick of TSV Ampfing was the league's top scorer with 29, his second of five top scorer awards in the league, achieved between 1980 and 1988.

Table
The 1981–82 season saw six new clubs in the league, SpVgg Unterhaching, 1. FC Bamberg, FC Vilshofen and TSV Schwaben Augsburg, all promoted from the Landesliga Bayern, while FC Augsburg and ESV Ingolstadt had been relegated from the 2. Bundesliga Süd to the league.									

For SpVgg Unterhaching it was the first-ever season in the league while Bamberg had last played in the league in 1976 and Vilshofen in 1980. Schwaben Augsburg, the first team to win Bayernliga promotion as a Landesliga runners-up after promotion/relegation play-off had been introduced in the previous season, had last played in the Bayernliga in 1960. Of the two clubs relegated to the league FC Augsburg had won it in 1979–80 and Ingolstadt the season before, both thereby earning promotion to the 2. Bundesliga.

2. Bundesliga promotion round
In the southern group the champions of the Oberliga Baden-Württemberg, Oberliga Hessen, Oberliga Südwest and the Bayernliga competed for two promotion spots to the 2. Bundesliga:

Bayernliga promotion round
The 15th placed Bayernliga team had to face the runners-up of the three Landesligas for one more place in the Bayernliga.

References

Sources

External links 
  of the Bavarian Football Association 

1981-82
3
1981–82 in European third tier association football leagues